Vika Idrettsforening (Vika Sports Association) (founded on 26 January 1918) is a Norwegian sports club from Oslo, normally simply called Vika. The association currently operates only with waterpolo. Previously there were several other sports part of the association such as boxing, football, athletics, handball, hockey, cycling and above all swimming. The members of the swimming team have won almost 400 Norwegian championships over the years. Today the waterpolo club is part of the Norwegian Swimming Federation, the Oslo Sport Group and Oslo Swimming Group.

References 

1918 establishments in Norway
Association football clubs established in 1918
Bandy clubs established in 1918
Cycling teams established in 1918
Handball clubs established in 1918
Ice hockey clubs established in 1918
Sports clubs in Norway
Sport in Oslo
Defunct athletics clubs in Norway
Defunct bandy clubs in Norway
Water polo clubs in Norway